Koettlitz Glacier is a large Antarctic glacier lying west of Mount Morning and Mount Discovery in the Royal Society Range, flowing from the vicinity of Mount Cocks northeastward between Brown Peninsula and the mainland into the ice shelf of McMurdo Sound.

It was discovered by the British National Antarctic Expedition (1901–04) which named it for Dr. Reginald Koettlitz, physician and botanist of the expedition.

See also
 Bulwark Stream
 List of glaciers in the Antarctic

References

Glaciers of Victoria Land
Scott Coast